Charles Puffy (born Károly Hochstadt; 3 November 1884 – 1942 or 1943) was a Hungarian film actor.

Biography
Hochstadt appeared in more than 130 films between 1914 and 1938. He was the only slapstick star in Hungary's silent film era, appearing under the name "Pufi" (meaning "Fatty" in Hungarian, referring to his weight) and Carlie Puffy in the United States for Universal Studios. His other stage names were Károly Huszár or Pufi Huszár. Besides his work on films, he frequently appeared on stage, mostly in comical roles.

Later, he worked in films in both Germany and the United States, including such classics as Fritz Lang's Dr. Mabuse, der Spieler (Dr. Mabuse, the Gambler) (1922) and Josef von Sternberg's Der blaue Engel (The Blue Angel) (1930). He used the names "Karl Huszar", "Karl Huszar-Puffy" or "Charles Puffy". In the sound era, he returned to his native Hungary, where he was featured in smaller roles in a number of films.

Puffy was Jewish, and decided to flee Hungary when the Holocaust started. He and his wife tried to get away to the United States, but Puffy died mid-way, in Tokyo, Japan. Other sources say that he and his wife were captured by the Red Army and imprisoned in a Gulag in Karaganda, Kazakhstan. Puffy participated in the camp's amateur acting company, but after one year in capture, he died of diphtheria.

Selected filmography 

 Tavasz a télben (1917)
 Az Ezredes (1917) aka The Colonel
 St. Peter's Umbrella (1917)
 Lili (1918)
 The Three Aunts (1921)
 About the Son (1921)
 The Convict of Cayenne (1921)
 The Earl of Essex (1922)
 Open All Night (1924)
 The Great Unknown (1924)
 The Love Thief (1926)
 The Mystery Club (1926)
 A Man's Past (1927)
 The Private Life of Helen of Troy (1927)
 The Man Who Laughs (1928)
 Yellow Lily (1928)
 My Heart is a Jazz Band (1929)
 The Hero of Every Girl's Dream (1929)
 Land Without Women (1929)
 My Sister and I (1929)
 Father and Son (1929)
 My Daughter's Tutor (1929)
 Ich küsse Ihre Hand, Madame (1929)
 The Great Longing (1930)
 Next, Please! (1930)
 The King of Paris (1930)
 The Adventurer of Tunis (1931)
 A Crafty Youth (1931)
 My Cousin from Warsaw (1931)
 Twice Married (1930)
 The Mad Bomberg (1932)
 Five from the Jazz Band (1932)
 Scandal in Budapest (1933)
 The Rakoczi March (1933)
 Little Mother (1935)

References

External links

1884 births
1942 deaths
Hungarian male silent film actors
Hungarian expatriates in Germany
Hungarian expatriates in the United States
Hungarian expatriates in Japan
Hungarian Jews
Male actors from Budapest
Silent film comedians
20th-century Hungarian male actors
Hungarian male film actors
Jewish Hungarian actors
People who died in the Gulag